Maria Helsbøl (born 17 September 1989) is a Danish badminton player. She was the bronze medalists at the 2015 European Games in the women's doubles event partnered with Lena Grebak. Helsbøl joined the national squad that won the European Women's Team Championships in 2014 and European Mixed Team Championships in 2015.

Achievements

European Games 
Women's doubles

BWF International Challenge/Series 
Women's doubles

Mixed doubles

  BWF International Challenge tournament
  BWF International Series tournament

References

External links 
 

1989 births
Living people
People from Lejre Municipality
Danish female badminton players
Badminton players at the 2015 European Games
European Games bronze medalists for Denmark
European Games medalists in badminton
Sportspeople from Region Zealand